The Nikitin NV-4 was a two-seat amphibious aircraft produced in the USSR in 1936.

Development
The tandem seat NV-4 with, enclosed cockpit, was a biplane with a central float integrated with the fuselage, in similar fashion to the Grumman J2F Duck. Constructed mainly of wood the wings were conventional in construction, with ribs built up over spars covered with plywood and fabric. The fuselage and integral tail unit were constructed from shpon (layers of birch ply glued over moulds and templates). A manually retractable undercarriage was housed either side of the central float, with the fixed steerable tailwheel doubling as a water-rudder. 
Flight testing began, piloted by Nikitin, but pressure of other work caused abandonment.

Specifications (NV-4)

See also

References

 Gunston, Bill. "Encyclopedia of Russian Aircraft 1875-1995". London:Osprey. 1995.

External links
 https://web.archive.org/web/19991004085143/http://www.aviation.ru/Nikitin/

Soviet and Russian sport aircraft
1930s Soviet sport aircraft
Floatplanes
Biplanes
Amphibious aircraft
NV-4
Single-engined tractor aircraft
Aircraft first flown in 1936